The third generation iPod Touch (marketed as "the new iPod touch", and colloquially known as the iPod Touch 3G, iPod Touch 3, or iPod 3) is a multi-touch mobile device designed and marketed by Apple Inc. with a touchscreen-based user interface. The successor to the 2nd-generation iPod Touch, it was unveiled and released at Apple's media event on September 9, 2009. It is (officially) compatible with up to iOS 5.1.1, which was released on May 7, 2012.

History 
The 3rd-generation iPod Touch was announced alongside the revised version of the (2nd generation) iPod Touch (8GB model), and it was initially only sold in 32GB and 64GB models. Due to the quiet unveiling and confusion, some resellers later sold and mistitled 8GB iPod touches (2nd generation) as the iPod touch (3rd generation), but this was neither done nor condoned by Apple. Just like the IPod Touch (2nd generation), the 8GB "iPod touch (3rd generation)" (late 2009 models) was only supported up to IOS 4.2.1, whereas the 32GB and 64GB (3rd generation) iPod touches were supported all the way up to iOS 5.1.1.

Features

Software 

It fully supports iOS 4 but has limited support for iOS 5 and did not receive support for Siri.

References 

IPod
IOS
Products introduced in 2009
Touchscreen portable media players
Digital audio players